Chichimecacihuatzin I was a queen consort of Tenochtitlan and an Aztec empress.

Family

Chichimecacihuatzin was a daughter of King Cuauhtototzin, granddaughter of King Tezcacohuatzin, niece of Queen Miahuaxihuitl and cousin-wife of Emperor Moctezuma I. She had at least one child with him, Princess Atotoztli II. It is likely she had another daughter, Chichimecacihuatzin II.

It is possible that her sons were Princes Iquehuacatzin and Mahchimaleh.

Chichimecacihuatzin was a grandmother of Emperors Axayacatl, Tizoc, and Ahuitzotl and great-grandmother of Emperors Moctezuma II and Cuitláhuac. Chichimecacihuatzin was also a grandmother of Queen Chalchiuhnenetzin.

See also
Family tree of Aztec monarchs

Notes
Factional Competition and Political Development in the New World by Elizabeth M. Brumfiel and John W. Fox

References

External links

Tenochca nobility
Queens of Tenochtitlan
15th-century indigenous people of the Americas
Nobility of the Americas